Marian Rogers Croak is a Vice President of Engineering at Google. She was previously the Senior Vice President of Research and Development at AT&T. She holds more than 200 patents. She was inducted into the Women in Technology International Hall of Fame in 2013. In 2022, Croak was inducted into the National Inventors Hall of Fame for her patent regarding VoIP (Voice over Internet Protocol) Technology. She is one of the first two Black women to receive that honor, along with Patricia Bath. Her invention allows users to make calls over the internet instead of a phone line. Today, the widespread use of VoIP technology is vital for remote work and conferencing.

Education and early career 
Croak was born on May 14, 1955, in New York City. Her father built her a home chemistry set, which inspired her to pursue a STEM career. She obtained a bachelor’s degree from Princeton University in 1977 and a Ph.D. specializing in Quantitative Analysis and Psychology in 1982 from the University of Southern California. After college, she joined AT&T Bell Laboratories in 1982, where she worked in a variety of positions for over 3 decades.

Career 
She started off in Bell’s Human Factors division, with the specific purpose of studying how technology could be used to positively impact human’s lives. Croak first began working on digital messaging applications, tasked with the study of determining if various messaging applications could communicate with each other. This kind of research was very novel, as the earliest form of the Internet would not come to full fruition until the next year in 1983. Bell Labs wanted to send voice, text, and video data digitally rather than using a standard phone line. And the favored mechanism for this was Asynchronous Transfer Mode (ATM) protocol, but Croak, along with the rest of her team, convinced AT&T to use TCP/IP instead. TCP/IP allowed for a standardized way of packaging and communicating information.

While at AT&T, Croak and her team contemplated the potential of digital telecommunications. She worked on advancing Voice over Internet Protocol (VoIP) technologies, converting voice data into digital signals that can be easily transmitted over the internet rather than using traditional phone lines. Her work has furthered the capabilities of audio and video conferencing.  

During her time at AT&T she patented the technology that allowed cellphone users to donate money to organizations using text messaging. She developed this technology during the aftermath of Hurricane Katrina, and it revolutionized how people donate to charitable organizations when a natural disaster occurs. She received the 2013 Thomas Edison Patent Award for this technology. She was inspired to do this after seeing AT&T develop technology that helped American Idol set up a voting system that relied on text messages rather than voice calls, in 2003. The technology that she created with co-inventor Hossein Eslambolchi, was not finalized until October 2005, a couple of months after Hurricane Katrina. But through this technology after the 2010 Haiti earthquake, more than $43 million in donations were collected by relief organizations through donations by text message.

Before leaving AT&T she held the title of Senior Vice President of Applications and Services Infrastructure. At AT&T she managed over 2,000 engineers and computer scientists responsible for over 500 programs impacting AT&T’s enterprise and consumer wireline and mobility services. Her responsibilities ranged from product realization and service planning to development and testing.

Croak joined Google in 2014, as a Vice President in the engineering group. At Google, she is responsible for expanding what the Internet is capable of doing around the world and increasing access to the Internet in the developing World. She created a new center of expertise on Responsible AI focusing on ethical development of AI within Google Research. Croak also works on racial justice efforts at Google and continues her goal of encouraging women and young girls in engineering.

Croak was inducted into the National Inventors Hall of Fame, the National Academy of Engineers, and the American Academy of Arts and Sciences in 2022.

Patents 
Croak has been awarded over 200 patents, almost half of which are in VoIP. Many of her inventions lay the foundations for the digital networks we know and use today. She was inducted into the National Inventors Hall of Fame in 2022 for her patent VoIP Technology U.S. Patent No. 7,599,359 Method and apparatus for monitoring end-to-end performance in a network. Today, the widespread use of VoIP technology is vital for remote work and conferencing, as well as personal communications. Over the years, VoIP as technology has continued to evolve. The International VoIP calls market is predicted to hold the significant share of all conversations by 2025. VoIP had an estimated market size of $30 Billion in 2020 and is projected to grow to $95 Billion by 2027.

She received a patent in 2005 for text-based donations to charity, along with co-inventor Hossein Eslambolchi, U.S. Patent 7,715,368 Method and Apparatus for dynamically debiting a donation. This technology enables a network to identify a particular charity, provide the designating funding to the charity, and then have the network service provider bill the original donor on its monthly bill.

Personal life 
Croak won the Edison Patent Awards in 2013 and 2014. She is currently a member of the Corporate Advisory Board for the Viterbi School of Engineering at her alma mater, the University of Southern California. Croak is also a former board member for such organizations as the Alliance for Telecommunications Industry Solutions; Catalyst; the Holocaust and Human Rights Museum (New Jersey); and the National Action Council for Minorities in Engineering. She has three grown children.

References 

1955 births
Living people
American women computer scientists
American computer scientists
University of Southern California alumni
Princeton University alumni
Google people
20th-century American scientists
20th-century American women scientists
21st-century American scientists
21st-century American women scientists
Scientists from New York City